Pyrrole-2-carboxylate decarboxylase is an enzyme with systematic name pyrrole-2-carboxylate carboxy-lyase. This enzyme catalyses the following chemical reaction

 (1) pyrrole-2-carboxylate  pyrrole + CO2
 (2) pyrrole-2-carboxylate + H2O  pyrrole + HCO3−

The enzyme catalyses both the carboxylation and decarboxylation reactions.

References

External links 
 

EC 4.1.1